The Golden Gate Biosphere Network (GGBN or the Network) is an internationally recognized voluntary coalition of federal, state, and local government agencies, nonprofit organizations, universities, and private partners within the Golden Gate Biosphere region (along the western portion of the San Francisco Bay Area). The Network works towards protecting the biosphere region's biodiversity and conserving its natural resources to maintain the quality of life for people within the region. The Network has been part of the UNESCO Man and Biosphere Programme since 1988 and is part of the US Biosphere Network and EuroMAB.  It is recognized by UNESCO due to the significant biodiversity of the region, as well as the Network's efforts to demonstrate and promote a balanced relationship between humans and the biosphere.

The Network periodically submits reports to UNESCO on current land-management issues related to the region's biodiversity and its connection to people. Recent efforts have focused on outreach to potential collaborators and promoting research on biodiversity and climate change adaptation.

About the Golden Gate Biosphere Network 
The Golden Gate Biosphere Network aims to collaboratively steward interaction between humans and the environment.  Originally recognized by UNESCO in 1988 for its significant ecological and cultural diversity, a 2017 periodic review brought renewed interest to the Golden Gate Biosphere Network and also expanded the boundaries of the GGB region by more than 26,000 square miles. In the years since, the Network has focused on expanding its collaborative partnerships in order to better connect the agencies, organizations, and non-profits of the region in an effort to more efficiently steward the natural resources of the region. As of 2021, the Network is made up of 20 partners representing multiple jurisdictions and sectors of the region:

 Audubon Canyon Ranch
 UC Davis, Bodega Marine Reserve
 Jasper Ridge Biological Preserve
 Cordell Bank National Marine Sanctuary
 Greater Farallones National Marine Sanctuary
 Farallon Islands National Wildlife Refuge
 Golden Gate National Recreation Area
 Fort Point National Historic Site
 Muir Woods National Monument
 Point Reyes National Seashore
 Marin Municipal Water District
 Mount Tamalpais State Park
 Samuel P. Taylor State Park
 Tomales Bay State Park
 Pepperwood Preserve
 Presidio Trust
 San Francisco Public Utilities Commission Peninsula Watershed
 Golden Gate National Parks Conservancy
 Point Blue Conservation
 National Park Service Regional Office (Interior Regions 8, 9, 10, 12)

Network Mission 
The Golden Gate Biosphere Network's mission as stated in its fact sheet:The biosphere attempts to create a relationship between humans and nature that allows for sustainable development, protection of wild animal and plant species, and acts as a source of research and education for both civilians and experts.

Biosphere Regions 
As recognized by the UNESCO Man and the Biosphere Programme, there are currently 714 biosphere regions in 129 countries around the world. Regions are recognized for containing a mosaic of ecological systems representative of major biogeographic regions, significant biodiversity, and their ability to explore and demonstrate approaches to sustainable development at the regional scale.

Biosphere regions serve three functions: 1) to foster relationships between humans and nature that allow for sustainable development, 2) to contribute to the conservation of landscapes, ecosystems, and species of flora and fauna, and 3) to provide support for research, monitoring, and education within the region.

Golden Gate Biosphere Region Geography 

It extends through the North-Central California coastal region from the Bodega Marine Reserve in the north to Jasper Ridge in the south and includes the Farallon Islands, Angel Island, and Alcatraz within the San Francisco Bay. The biosphere region is situated on both sides of the San Andreas Fault. Each side has a completely different type of bedrock, and the western side of the rift is moving northward. 

Core areas, otherwise known as protected area, are legally constituted core areas devoted to long-term protection. The core areas of the Golden Gate Biosphere region are of sufficient size to serve the three functions required of biosphere regions outlined above. Marine protected areas within the biosphere include the following conservation units:

 Gualala (8,260 ha)
 Stewart's Point (6,227 ha)
 Jenner (11,955 ha)
 Bodega Head (2,431 ha)
 Tomales Point (6,393 ha)
 Cordell Bank Reef (10,374 ha)
 Point Reyes and Drakes Estero (12,932 ha)
 Duxbury Reef and Bolinas Lagoon (10,746 ha)
 North and South Farallon Islands (12,764 ha)

Terrestrial protected areas include the following conservation units:

 Bodega Marine Reserve (137 ha)
 Point Reyes National Seashore - Phillip Burton Wilderness (10,014 ha)
 Audubon Canyon Ranch (421 ha)
 Farallon National Wildlife Refuge (85 ha)
 San Francisco Peninsula Watershed (San Francisco Public Utilities Commission) (7,446 ha)
 Jasper Ridge Biological Preserve (413 ha)
In addition to these protected areas, the Golden Gate Biosphere region includes buffer zones and transition areas. Buffer zones, also known as managed use areas, are clearly identified and surrounding or contiguous to the core area or areas, where only activities compatible with  conservation objectives and sound ecological practices can take place. These areas help reinforce scientific research, monitoring, training and education. Transition areas, or areas of partnership and cooperation, are outer areas where the greatest activity is allowed. Sustainable resource management practices are promoted and developed in these areas in an effort to foster socio-culturally and ecologically sustainable economic and human development.

Ecology 
The biosphere is considered a biodiversity hotspot because human habitation is threatening its biodiversity. With over 3000 terrestrial and marine plant and animal species, the Golden Gate Biosphere includes marine and aquatic ecosystems as well as terrestrial ecosystems ranging from evergreen forests (including the iconic and endemic Coast Redwood), oak woodlands, chaparral, coastal scrub and prairies, rare serpentine grasslands, as well as coastal and offshore islands. It also contains four Ramsar Wetlands of international importance: the Laguna de Santa Rosa Wetland Complex, Tomales Bay, Bolinas Lagoon, and San Francisco Bay Estuary. These habitats are threatened by human activities and settlement within the region.

A diverse range of marine, coastal, and upland habitats of the California chaparral and woodlands and Northern California coastal forests ecoregions may be found, including mixed evergreen forests, Coast Redwood forests, Douglas-fir forests, Bishop pine forests, oak forests, woodlands and savannas, northern coastal scrub, chaparral, coastal dune, coastal strand, tidepools, kelp forests, coastal grasslands, and marshes. The associated fauna is also rich with cougars, Tule elk, California sea lions, elephant seals, and many shorebirds. 

Under the federal Endangered Species Act, the Bay Area is home to over 90 endangered or threatened animal and plant species. Endangered land animals found here include the California red-legged frog, Alameda whipsnake, California tiger salamander. Endangered Fish include Central California Coast steelhead trout, coho salmon, and southern green sturgeon. Endangered birds and butterflies include the Western snowy plover, Brown pelican, Mission blue butterfly, and Bay checkerspot butterfly. Endangered plants include the Contra Costa goldfields, Suisun thistle, yellow larkspur, San Francisco Wallflower, and Clarkia franciscana.

Public Use 
The Golden Gate Biosphere region is unique in that its marine, coastal, and upland resources are adjacent to a major metropolitan area and thus provide easy access to outdoor education and recreation for the inhabitants of the San Francisco Bay metropolitan area. 

With over 26.5 million annual visitors, the biosphere region provides important economic opportunities to the San Francisco Bay area. Many recreational activities such as sport fishing, hiking, bicycling, whale watching, sightseeing, backpacking, picnicking, kayaking, surfing, boating, swimming, scuba-diving, snorkeling, cultural activities, museums, dining, and overnight lodging are available.

Agricultural activities within the GGB region are limited to beef and dairy ranching within Point Reyes National Seashore and the northern district of Golden Gate National Recreation Area. Approximately 28,000 acres of land are permitted for ranching. The National Park Service and  ranchers collaborate on a number of issues of importance to maintaining biodiversity within the biosphere, including water quality, archaeological site preservation, ranch diversification, weed management, historic structure and landscape maintenance, ecologically sound agricultural practices, and habitat restoration.

Stewardship and Research 
The GGBN work collaboratively on projects related to stewardship, science, and education. For instance, partners cooperate on tidal pool monitoring and public education in the area of Mount Tamalpais State Park. Another joint activity is the Coho salmon restoration project, which requires habitat inventorying and mapping of several critical watersheds. As well, within the past decade, projects within the 1,492 acres of the Presidio site include: the removal of six landfills, the locations of which were subsequently restored with native habitats including one creek, three dune systems where the endangered San Francisco Lessingia habitat and populations were increased, one riparian system, two serpentine sites where the endangered Franciscan Clarkia was increased and one Colma site. 

The Network also cooperates with the Iroise Biosphere Reserve of France in a comparison of coastal ecosystem recovery after human use changes. Research covers topics such as the management of commercially important resources such as fisheries, threats to ecosystems such as oil spills, pollutants, and invasive species, and episodic events such as wildfires and climate extremes.

Gallery

Sources

External links 

 UNESCO.org: Golden Gate Biosphere Reserve

References 

Natural history of the San Francisco Bay Area
Biosphere reserves of the United States
Nature reserves in California
Parks in the San Francisco Bay Area
San Francisco Bay
Environment of the San Francisco Bay Area